Earl Black may refer to:
 Earl Black (political scientist)
 Earl Black (wrestler)